Harry Edwin Wood (3 February 1881 – 27 February 1946) was an English astronomer, director of the Union Observatory in Johannesburg, and discoverer of minor planets.

Wood was born in Manchester, graduating from Manchester University in 1902 with first class honours in physics, going on to gain an MSc in 1905.  In 1906 he was appointed the Chief Assistant at the Transvaal Meteorological Observatory, which soon acquired telescopes and which became known as the Union Observatory and later Republic Observatory. In 1909, he married Mary Ethel Greengrass, also a physics graduate of Manchester University. Wood served as the observatory's director from 1928 to 1941, succeeding Robert Innes. He also served as the president of the Astronomical Society of South Africa from 1929 to 1930.

Wood is credited by the Minor Planet Center with the discovery of 12 numbered asteroids during 1911–1932.

He died in Mortimer, near Cradock, South Africa, in 1946. The asteroid 1660 Wood, discovered by his colleague Jacobus Bruwer at Johannesburg, is named in his honor.

See also 
 List of minor planet discoverers

References

External links 
 

1881 births
1946 deaths
20th-century British astronomers
Alumni of the University of Manchester
Discoverers of asteroids
English emigrants to South Africa
Scientists from Manchester
Presidents of the Southern Africa Association for the Advancement of Science